T helper 3 cells (Th3) are a subset of T lymphocytes with immunoregulary and immunosuppressive functions, that can be induced by administration of foreign oral antigen. Th3 cells act mainly through the secretion of anti-inflammatory cytokine transforming growth factor beta (TGF-β). Th3 have been described both in mice and human as CD4+FOXP3− regulatory T cells. Th3 cells were first described in research focusing on oral tolerance in the experimental autoimmune encephalitis (EAE) mouse model and later described as CD4+CD25−FOXP3−LAP+ cells, that can be induced in the gut by oral antigen through T cell receptor (TCR) signalling.

The function of T helper cells generally is to mediate the immune response by secreting cytokines and interacting with B-cells to enhance or inhibit their activity. This is of particular importance in the gut as this is where the highest load of foreign material, food, is present. Th3 cells are involved in mucosal immunity and protecting mucosal surfaces in the gut from non-pathogenic non-self antigens. They mediate this non-inflammatory environment by secreting TGF-β and IL-10. TGF-beta promotes the class switch to low concentrations of IgA which is noninflammatory. IgA does not usually activate the complement system and is not involved with phagocytosis. Th3 inhibits Th1 and Th2 cells.

Th3 cells have different cytokine requirements for their growth from CD25+CD4+ Treg cells. The survival of CD25+CD4+ Treg cells is dependent upon interleukin 2 (IL-2), while in vitro differentiation of Th3 cells is enhanced by TGF-β, IL-4, and IL-10.

Findings suggest that Th3 cells are a different lineage from naturally arising CD25+CD4+ Treg cells, but it is still unclear whether Th3 cells are the same as induced Treg cells because of the lack of a specific marker for Th3 cells. It was previously shown that TGF-β was produced by intestinal dendritic cells, which has been considered to be the source of cytokines for the induction of Th3 cells in the intestine. Additionally, since TGF-β production was induced by cytotoxic T-lymphocyte antigen 4 (CTLA-4), which is constitutively expressed on naturally arising Treg cells, it is possible that TGF-β production from Treg cells through CTLA-4− mediated signaling may stimulate the differentiation of both induced Treg cells and Th3 cells.

Th3 phenotype and secreted molecules 

Th3 cells are characterised as CD4+CD25−CD69+FOXP3-LAP+ cells. Unlike the well characterised T regulatory (Treg ) cells, Th3 cells do not express transcription factor FOXP3. There is a lack of specific transcription factor for full and reliable recognition of the Th3 cell population.

Type II-lectin receptor CD69 is presented on cell surface shortly after activation. The presence of CD69 is not specific for Th3 cells, since it is expressed on other lymphocytes, mainly subsets that are tissue resident. The latency-associated peptide (LAP) noncovalently bounds TGF-β and can be expressed by many cells of the immune system.

In tumors Th3 cells can express lymphocyte activation gene-3 (LAG3). Th3 cells produce vast amounts of TGF-β and to a lesser degree also the anti-inflammatory cytokine interleukin 10 (IL-10). In colorectal cancer Th3 cells were described as 50 times more potent immune suppressors than the classical regulatory FOXP3+ T lymphocytes and their functions was mainly mediated by secretion of suppressive cytokines.

LAG3 acts as a negative regulator of T cell activation and function and can also be expressed on NK cells and other T cells, than Th3. Because of its structural similarity to CD4, LAG3 can bind MHC class II molecules.

Activation and effector functions 
Th3 cells can be activated by TCR stimulation after the recognition of an antigen or induced from CD4+ T lymphocytes by TGF-β in the presence of IL-10 and IL-4 cytokines.

Th3 participate in the regulation of the immune response via mechanisms independent on cell-to-cell contact. Secretion of anti-inflammatory cytokine TGF-β by Th3 cells helps to maintain homeostasis in the gut and suppress exaggerated inflammatory and autoimmune responses in the body. TGF-β is a crucial cytokine for maintaining the naturally occurring Treg cells, that suppress Th1 and Th2 immune functions.  Th3 cells can also directly suppress Th1 and Th2 cells by secretion of TGF-β and provide help to B cells towards IgA secretion.

References

T cells